Bury Me in My Rings is the third album by indie band The Elected which was released on 17 May 2011 by Vagrant Records. It is described as "complete with twelve shimmering pop songs reminiscent of mid-century West Coast rock." A first single, 'Babyface', was exclusively released on Spin.com on 2 March 2011.

Track listing
"Born to Love You"
"Babyface"
"Look at Me Now"
"Jailbird"
"Go for the Throat"
"This Will Be Worth It"
"Trip Round the World"
"When I’m Gone"
"Who Are You"
"Have You Been Cheated"
"See the Light"
"Time is Coming"
"Some People" (Bonus Track)

References

External links
The Elected on MySpace
Vagrant Records

The Elected albums
2011 albums
Vagrant Records albums